The Agra gharana is a tradition of Hindustani classical vocal music descended from the Nauhar Bani. So far, Nauhar Bani has been traced back to around 1300 AD, during the reign of Emperor Allauddin Khilji of Delhi.

The first known musician of this tradition is Nayak Gopal. The style prevalent then in the Gharana was "Dhrupad-Dhamar". Ghagghe Khudabuksh (1790–1880 AD) introduced the "Khayal" style of Gwalior Gharana into Agra gharana which Khudabaksh learnt from Natthan Paribaksh of Gwalior.

Pedagogical genealogy
The following maps are based on recorded accounts by Vilayat Hussain Khan and Yunus Hussain Khan.

Ancestral Lineage

Distinguishing characteristics
The gayaki (style of singing) of the Agra Gharana is a blend of khayal gayaki and dhrupad-dhamar. In training, both the khayal and dhrupad components run hand in hand and are not taught in an isolated fashion. This is obvious from the method of singing notes of the Agra Gharana which demands that the projection of voice be more forceful and voluminous than usually encountered in khayal gayaki, as well as uttering notes open and bare (without grace notes).

Most khayal performances by artists of Agra gharana commence with the nom-tom alaap, a tradition unique to the Agra gharana. Different facets of a raga are displayed with the help of bandish while the raga is elaborated using .

The gharana adopts a kind of voice production which relies on a flatter version of the vowel sound "a", which makes its music agreeable to rhythmic variations and is best suited for a deep masculine voice. Emphasis is laid on bold, full-throated and robust voice production, and singing in the lower register (mandra) is favoured. Keeping in tune with its dhrupadic origins, the singers use broad and powerful ornamentations, extensive glides and resonant articulations of notes. As with the Gwalior gharana, the Agra singers accentuate the importance of the bandish and its methodical exposition. Singers following Faiyaz Khan's style resort to the dhrupadic nom-tom alaap before singing the bandish. In fact, layakari is the foundation on which the singers build the edifice of the bandish. Agra singers'  are eagerly awaited, as are their nifty ways of arriving at the same, by building up anticipation within the listener.

This is the only Gharana that has still continued to sing Dhrupad-Dhamar along with Nom-Tom Alap, Khayal, Thumri, Tappa, Tarana, Hori,

Some prominent exponents 

Faiyaz Khan (1886–1950) "Prempiya"
Abdullah Khan "Manhar Piya'
Vilayat Hussain Khan "Pran Piya" (1895–1962)
Khadim Hussain Khan "Sajan Piya" (1907–1993)
Latafat Hussain Khan "Prem Das"
Ata Hussain Khan "Ratan Piya"
Kaale Khan "Saras Piya"
Bashir Ahmed Khan
Aqeel Ahmed Khan
Wasi Ahmed Khan
Shabbir Ahmed Khan
Naseem Ahmed Khan
Sharafat Hussain Khan "Prem Rang" (1930–1985)
Yunus Hussain Khan
Yaqoob Hussain Khan
Yusuf Hussain Khan
Khurshid Hussain Khan
Shamim Ahmed Khan
Ghulam Rasool Khan
Anwar Hussain Khan
Ghulam Hussain Khan Raja Miyan
Arif Hussain 
Asif Hussain
Shrikrishna Narayan Ratanjankar "Sujan" (1900–1974)
Babanrao Haldankar "Raspiya" (1927–2016)
Zohrabai (1868–1913) 
Pt. Dhrubatara Joshi- Sitar & Vocal(Premrang)--(1912-1993)
Pt. Yashpaul  "Sagun Piya" (b. 1937)
Ramarao V. Naik (1909–1998)
Lalith J. Rao (b. 1942)
Sumati Mutatkar (1916–2007)
Subhra Guha (b. 1956)
Ustad Waseem Ahmed Khan (1988-present)
 Ustad Mohsin Ahmed Khan Niazi (1965-2020)
 Ahsan Ahmed Khan
 Mehboob Nadeem Sitar

Bibliography

References

External links
 Agra gharana ITC Sangeet Research Academy

 
Vocal gharanas
Agra
Music of Uttar Pradesh